Ola Schubert (formerly Ola Bergner; born 19 March 1972, in Täby) is a Swedish Flash animator whose films have won awards in film festivals and on popular internet sites such as Newgrounds and FWA. In 2019 he lost a copyright suit against the Hatten company over the design for the babblers and was ordered to pay 2.5 million Swedish kronor.

Filmography
 1999—A Christmas Tale
 2000—A Winter Story
 2001—Gooberstory
 2002—Nim's Winter Tale
 2005—Sumo the Bamboo Man
 2007—Captain Flame
 2014— Bath House, co-animator with Johanna Schubert and Niki Lindroth von Bahr

Awards
 2002—2nd place Jury Award in the Linear Category at Flash Award 2002 for Gooberstory
 2003 (28 May)—Nim's Winter Tale wins Favorite Website Awards
 2003 (7 June)—Gooberstory wins FWA One award
 2003 (10 July)—Gooberstory wins the Story category in Flashforward 2003 in New York; Nim's Winter Tale is nominated.

See also
 Flash cartoon

References

External links
 Ola Schubert's movies on Newgrounds

1972 births
Living people
People from Täby Municipality
Swedish film directors
Swedish animated film directors
Swedish animators
Flash artists